USS Ericsson (Destroyer No. 56/DD-56) was an  built for the United States Navy prior to the American entry into World War I. The ship was the second U.S. Navy vessel named in honor of John Ericsson, the Swedish-born builder of the ironclad warship  during the American Civil War.

Ericsson was laid down by the New York Shipbuilding of Camden, New Jersey, in November 1913 and launched in August of the following year. She was armed with four  guns and had eight 21 inch (533 mm) torpedo tubes.
			
After her May 1916 commissioning, Ericsson sailed off the east coast and in the Caribbean. After the United States entered World War I in April 1917, Ericsson was part of the first U.S. destroyer squadron sent overseas. Patrolling the Irish Sea out of Queenstown, Ireland, Ericsson made several unsuccessful attacks on U-boats, and rescued survivors of several ships sunk by the German craft.

Upon returning to the United States after the war, Ericsson conducted operations with the destroyers of the Atlantic Fleet until August 1919, when she was placed in reserve, still in commission. After a brief stint of operations in mid 1921, she was placed in reserve until she was decommissioned at Philadelphia in June 1922. In June 1924, Ericsson was transferred to the United States Coast Guard to help enforce Prohibition as a part of the "Rum Patrol". She operated under the name USCGC Ericsson (CG-5) until May 1932, when she was returned to the Navy. She was sold for scrap in August 1934.

Design and construction 
Construction of the vessel was awarded to New York Shipbuilding of Camden, New Jersey, which laid down her keel on 10 November 1913. Just over nine months later, on 22 August 1914, Ericsson was launched by sponsor Mrs. J. Washington Logue, wife of the Pennsylvania Congressman. The ship was named in honor of John Ericsson, the builder of the ironclad warship  during the American Civil War, and was the second U.S. Navy ship named for the Swedish native.

Ericsson had two Zoelly steam turbines that drove her two screw propellers, and an additional triple-expansion steam engine connected to one of the propeller shafts for cruising purposes.

Ericsson was also equipped with eight  torpedo tubes. The General Board of the United States Navy had called for two anti-aircraft guns for the O'Brien-class ships, as well as provisions for laying up to 36 floating mines. From sources, it is unclear if these recommendations were followed for Ericsson or any of the other ships of the class.

Early career 
USS Ericsson was commissioned into the United States Navy on 14 August 1915 under the command of Lieutenant Commander W. L. Pryor. From October through December 1915, Ericsson operated out of New York and Newport, Rhode Island, on drills, in training, and on the Neutrality Patrol.  With the Torpedo Flotilla of the Atlantic Fleet she sailed on 7 January 1916 for maneuvers in the Caribbean, using Key West and Guantanamo Bay as bases.  She returned to Newport on 23 May.

At 05:30 on Sunday, 8 October 1916, wireless reports came in of a German submarine stopping ships near the Lightship Nantucket, off the eastern end of Long Island. After an SOS from the British steamer West Point was received at about 12:30, Rear Admiral Albert Gleaves ordered Ericsson and other destroyers at Newport to attend to survivors; Ericsson was the fourth of seventeen destroyers to get underway. The destroyers arrived on the scene at about 17:00 when the U-boat,  under the command of Kapitänleutnant Hans Rose, fired shots across the bow of the Holland-America Line cargo ship , signaling her to stop. Shortly after, U-53 stopped the British passenger ship . As Rose had done with three other ships U-53 had sunk earlier in the day, he gave passengers and crew aboard Blommersdijk and Stephano adequate time to abandon the ships. Ericsson was one of six destroyers taking on passengers from Stephano that witnessed her sinking. In total, 226 survivors from U-53s five victims were rescued by the destroyer flotilla. Ericsson transported 81—including 35 women and children—back to Newport, where she arrived at 01:30 on 9 October.

After finishing out the rest of 1916 at Newport, Ericsson again joined in exercises in the Caribbean for the first three months of 1917, and then returned to New York City and Newport to prepare for distant service.

World War I 
After the United States declared war on Germany on 6 April 1917 entering World War I, Ericsson was prepared for overseas duty.
for Queenstown, Ireland, where they arrived on 17 May. Ericsson began patrol duty in the war zone, and almost at once came upon a surfaced U-boat shelling two sailing ships. She opened fire, forcing the submarine down and preventing further attack, then picked up 37 survivors of the sailing ships.  She continued on patrol and escort duty, and on 28 September, at night, sighted a surfaced submarine, at which she fired.  Ericsson dropped depth charges, but before she could carry out her plan to ram the German U-boat, she lost contact in the darkness.

Ericsson continued to sail out of Queenstown on patrol and escorting convoys, many times attacking submarines, standing by damaged ships, and rescuing survivors.  After June 1918, she was based at Brest, France; and during that summer, usually sailed about  ahead of convoys, towing aloft a kite balloon used for observation.  At the close of the war, Ericsson was overhauled at Liverpool, but returned to Brest in time to take part on 13 December in the welcoming honors rendered for President Woodrow Wilson, arriving in France on the transport .  On 21 December, Ericsson departed for the United States, arriving at New York on 8 January 1919.

Postwar 
In May 1919, Ericsson sailed to the Azores to observe and support the historic first aerial crossing of the Atlantic, made by Navy seaplanes. After exercises along the east coast and in the Caribbean, she entered New York Navy Yard for repairs, and there was placed in reserve, still in commission, on 7 August.  She was laid up in reduced commission at Philadelphia and Charleston, South Carolina, in the years that followed, and put to sea only during the summer of 1921, when drills and exercises took her to Newport.  She was decommissioned at Philadelphia on 16 June 1922.

United States Coast Guard career 
On 17 January 1920, Prohibition was instituted by law in the United States. Soon, the smuggling of alcoholic beverages along the coastlines of the United States became widespread and blatant. The Treasury Department eventually determined that the United States Coast Guard simply did not have the ships to constitute a successful patrol. To cope with the problem, President Calvin Coolidge in 1924 authorized the transfer from the Navy to the Coast Guard of twenty old destroyers that were in reserve and out of commission. Ericsson was activated and acquired by the Coast Guard on 7 June 1924.

Designated CG-5, Ericsson was commissioned on 28 May 1925, and joined the "Rum Patrol" to aid in the attempt to enforce prohibition laws. On 11 April 1926, she captured the rum-runner Atalanta. During her time in the Coast Guard, Ericssons gunners were awarded the USCG Gunnery Trophy for Destroyers for 1925–26 and 1926–27. Ericsson was decommissioned at the Philadelphia Navy Yard on 30 April 1930, and returned to the U.S. Navy on 23 May 1932. She was scrapped and her salvaged material sold on 22 August 1934 in accordance with the London Naval Treaty.

Notes

References

Bibliography

External links 
 

 

O'Brien-class destroyers
Ships built by New York Shipbuilding Corporation
1915 ships
World War I destroyers of the United States
Ships of the United States Coast Guard